Älvsered is a locality situated in Falkenberg Municipality, Halland County, Sweden, with 433 inhabitants in 2010.

References 

Populated places in Falkenberg Municipality